Heineken Tarwebok was a bock beer produced by the Dutch brewing company Heineken. The beer was made in the brewery in 's-Hertogenbosch in the Netherlands. In the fall of 2020, it was announced that Heineken Tarwebok was removed from the Heineken portfolio.

References

External links 
 

Beer in the Netherlands
Heineken brands